The 2018 Indoor Football League season was the tenth season of the Indoor Football League (IFL). The league played with six teams, after the suspension of operations of three teams, the departure of another two teams, and the addition and subsequent suspension of two teams.

The top four teams made the IFL playoffs with the semifinals consisting of the top seed hosting the fourth seed and the second hosting the third before the winners met in the 2018 United Bowl.

Offseason 

Project Fanchise, the ownership of the Salt Lake Screaming Eagles that joined the IFL in 2017 and also bought the Colorado Crush during the season, announced that they would leave the IFL after one season.  For the 2018 season, the Arizona Rattlers, Cedar Rapids Titans, Green Bay Blizzard, Iowa Barnstormers, and Nebraska Danger had all committed to play. However, the Spokane Empire had ceased operations at the close of the 2017 season. The Sioux Falls Storm left the league for Champions Indoor Football on August 30, 2017, with the Wichita Falls Nighthawks to follow soon after. On September 12, 2017, it was announced that the Bloomington Edge and West Michigan Ironmen had joined the IFL for the 2018 season.

The CIF then attempted to sue the IFL, Edge, and Ironmen for leaving the CIF after the two teams had already signed league affiliation agreements with the CIF for 2018. The IFL then threatened to sue the CIF, Storm, and Nighthawks in return despite neither former IFL team signing an affiliation agreement with the IFL for 2018. The CIF then retracted their lawsuit with the IFL but also removed the Storm and Nighthawks from their 2018 schedule. After the IFL meetings in October 2017, the Storm returned to the IFL but the Nighthawks had to suspend operations. While the CIF did drop the lawsuit against the IFL, it filed for an injunction against the Edge and Ironmen teams from participating in the IFL for breaking the terms of their signed affiliation agreements. A temporary injunction from participation was granted on January 31, 2018, with the court ruling determining that both teams had been offered bribes from the owner of the Arizona Rattlers to break their contracts with the CIF. The schedule was revised in February for the six participating teams stating the Edge and Ironmen were to return in 2019.

Teams

Standings

Playoffs

Season awards

References